Below is the list of populated places in Elazığ Province, Turkey by districts. In the following lists first place in each list is the administrative center of the district.

Elazığ 

 Elazığ
 Acıpayam, Elâzığ
 Akçakale, Elazığ
 Akçakiraz, Elazığ
 Alaca, Elazığ
 Alatarla, Elazığ
 Alpağut, Elazığ
 Altınkuşak, Elazığ
 Arındık, Elazığ
 Aşağıdemirtaş, Elazığ
 Avcılı, Elazığ
 Aydıncık, Elazığ
 Aydınlar, Elazığ
 Badempınarı, Elazığ
 Bağdere, Elazığ
 Bağlarca, Elazığ
 Bahçekapı, Elazığ
 Balıbey, Elazığ
 Ballıca, Elazığ
 Balpınar, Elazığ
 Beşikköy, Elazığ
 Beşoluk, Elazığ
 Beydalı, Elazığ
 Beydoğmuş, Elazığ
 Bölüklü, Elazığ
 Bulutlu, Elazığ
 Cevizdere, Elazığ
 Cipköy, Elazığ
 Çağlar, Elazığ
 Çalıca, Elazığ
 Çatalharman, Elazığ
 Çöteli, Elazığ
 Dallıca, Elazığ
 Dambüyük, Elazığ
 Dedepınarı, Elazığ
 Değirmenönü, Elazığ
 Dereboğazı, Elazığ
 Doğankuş, Elazığ
 Durupınar, Elazığ
 Elmapınarı, Elazığ
 Erbildi, Elazığ
 Esenkent, Elazığ
 Fatmalı, Elazığ
 Gedikyolu, Elazığ
 Gökçe, Elazığ
 Gölardı, Elazığ
 Gölköy, Elazığ
 Gözebaşı, Elazığ
 Gözpınar, Elazığ
 Gülmahmut, Elazığ
 Gümüşbağlar, Elazığ
 Günaçtı, Elazığ
 Günbağı, Elazığ
 Güneyçayırı, Elazığ
 Güzelyalı, Elazığ
 Hal, Elazığ
 Hankendi, Elazığ
 Harmantepe, Elazığ
 Hıdırbaba, Elazığ
 Hoşköy, Elazığ
 Işıkyolu, Elazığ
 İçme, Elazığ
 İkitepe, Elazığ
 Kalkantepe, Elazığ
 Kaplıkaya, Elazığ
 Karaali, Elazığ
 Karaçavuş, Elazığ
 Karasaz, Elazığ
 Karataş, Elazığ
 Kavakpınar, Elazığ
 Kavaktepe, Elazığ
 Kepektaş, Elazığ
 Kıraçköy, Elazığ
 Koçharmanı, Elazığ
 Koçkale, Elazığ
 Konakalmaz, Elazığ
 Koparuşağı, Elazığ
 Korucu, Elazığ
 Koruköy, Elazığ
 Kozluk, Elazığ
 Körpe, Elazığ
 Kumla, Elazığ
 Kurtdere, Elazığ
 Kuşhane, Elazığ
 Kuyulu, Elazığ
 Küllük, Elazığ
 Meşeli, Elazığ
 Mollakendi, Elazığ
 Muratcık, Elazığ
 Nuralı, Elazığ
 Obuz, Elazığ
 Ortaçalı, Elazığ
 Oymaağaç, Elazığ
 Öksüzuşağı, Elazığ
 Örençay, Elazığ
 Pelteköy, Elazığ
 Pirinççi, Elazığ
 Poyraz, Elazığ
 Sakabaşı, Elazığ
 Salkaya, Elazığ
 Sancaklı, Elazığ
 Sarıbük, Elazığ
 Sarıçubuk, Elazığ
 Sarıgül, Elazığ
 Sarıkamış, Elazığ
 Sarılı, Elazığ
 Sarıtosun, Elazığ
 Sarıyakup, Elazığ
 Sedeftepe, Elazığ
 Serince, Elazığ
 Sinanköy, Elazığ
 Sünköy, Elazığ
 Sütlüce, Elazığ
 Şabanlı, Elazığ
 Şahaplı, Elazığ
 Şahinkaya, Elazığ
 Şehsuvar, Elazığ
 Tadım, Elazığ
 Temürköy, Elazığ
 Tepeköy, Elazığ
 Tohumlu, Elazığ
 Uzuntarla, Elazığ
 Üçağaç, Elazığ
 Ürünveren, Elazığ
 Yalındamlar, Elazığ
 Yalnız, Elazığ
 Yazıkonak, Elazığ
 Yazıpınarı, Elazığ
 Yedigöze, Elazığ
 Yemişlik, Elazığ
 Yenikapı, Elazığ
 Yenikonak, Elazığ
 Yolçatı, Elazığ
 Yolüstü, Elazığ
 Yukarıbağ, Elazığ
 Yukarıçakmak, Elazığ
 Yukarıdemirtaş, Elazığ
 Yurtbaşı, Elazığ
 Yünlüce, Elazığ

Ağın

 Ağın
 Altınayva, Ağın
 Aşağıyabanlı, Ağın
 Bademli, Ağın
 Bahadırlar, Ağın
 Balkayası, Ağın
 Beyelması, Ağın
 Demirçarık, Ağın
 Dibekli, Ağın
 Kaşpınar, Ağın
 Modanlı, Ağın
 Öğrendik, Ağın
 Pulköy, Ağın
 Samançay, Ağın
 Saraycık, Ağın
 Yedibağ, Ağın
 Yenipayam, Ağın

Alacakaya

 Alacakaya
 Altıoluk, Alacakaya
 Bakladamlar, Alacakaya
 Çakmakkaya, Alacakaya
 Çanakça, Alacakaya
 Çataklı, Alacakaya
 Esenlik, Alacakaya
 Gürçubuk, Alacakaya
 Halkalı, Alacakaya
 İncebayır, Alacakaya
 Kayranlı, Alacakaya
 Sularbaşı, Alacakaya
 Yalnızdamlar, Alacakaya

Arıcak

 Arıcak
 Bozçavuş, Arıcak
 Bükardı, Arıcak
 Çavuşdere, Arıcak
 Çevrecik, Arıcak
 Erbağı, Arıcak
 Erimli, Arıcak
 Göründü, Arıcak
 Kambertepe, Arıcak
 Karakaş, Arıcak
 Kayahisar, Arıcak
 Küplüce, Arıcak
 Ormanpınar, Arıcak
 Üçocak, Arıcak
 Yoğunbilek, Arıcak

Baskil

 Baskil
 Akdemir, Baskil
 Akuşağı, Baskil
 Aladikme, Baskil
 Alangören, Baskil
 Altınuşağı, Baskil
 Aşağıkuluşağı, Baskil
 Beşbölük, Baskil
 Bilaluşağı, Baskil
 Bozoğlak, Baskil
 Çavuşlu, Baskil
 Çiğdemlik, Baskil
 Deliktaş, Baskil
 Demirlibahçe, Baskil
 Doğancık, Baskil
 Düğüntepe, Baskil
 Emirhan, Baskil
 Eskiköy, Baskil
 Gemici, Baskil
 Habibuşağı, Baskil
 Hacıhüseyinler, Baskil
 Hacımehmetli, Baskil
 Hacımustafaköy, Baskil
 Hacıuşağı, Baskil
 Harabekayış, Baskil
 Hüyükköy, Baskil
 Işıklar, Baskil
 İçlikaval, Baskil
 İmikuşağı, Baskil
 Kadıköy, Baskil
 Karaali, Baskil
 Karagedik, Baskil
 Karakaş, Baskil
 Karoğlu, Baskil
 Kayabeyli, Baskil
 Kızıluşağı, Baskil
 Koçyolu, Baskil
 Konacık, Baskil
 Konalga, Baskil
 Kumlutarla, Baskil
 Kuşsarayı, Baskil
 Kutlugün, Baskil
 Meydancık, Baskil
 Paşakonağı, Baskil
 Pınarlı, Baskil
 Resulkahya, Baskil
 Sarıtaş, Baskil
 Söğütdere, Baskil
 Sultanuşağı, Baskil
 Suyatağı, Baskil
 Şahaplı, Baskil
 Şahindere, Baskil
 Şituşağı, Baskil
 Tabanbükü, Baskil
 Tatlıpayam, Baskil
 Tavşanuşağı, Baskil
 Topaluşağı, Baskil
 Yalındam, Baskil
 Yaylanlı, Baskil
 Yeniocak, Baskil
 Yıldızlı, Baskil
 Yukarıkuluşağı, Baskil
 Yürekli, Baskil

Karakoçan

 Karakoçan
 Ağamezrası, Karakoçan
 Akarbaşı, Karakoçan
 Akbulak, Karakoçan
 Akçiçek, Karakoçan
 Akkuş, Karakoçan
 Akpınar, Karakoçan
 Akyokuş, Karakoçan
 Alabal, Karakoçan
 Alayağmur, Karakoçan
 Altınoluk, Karakoçan
 Aşağıovacık, Karakoçan
 Bahçecik, Karakoçan
 Balcalı, Karakoçan
 Bardaklı, Karakoçan
 Başyurt, Karakoçan
 Bazlama, Karakoçan
 Beydere, Karakoçan
 Bulgurcuk, Karakoçan
 Cumhuriyet, Karakoçan
 Çalıkaya, Karakoçan
 Çamardı, Karakoçan
 Çan, Karakoçan
 Çanakçı, Karakoçan
 Çatalyol, Karakoçan
 Çavuşyolu, Karakoçan
 Çayırdam, Karakoçan
 Çayırgülü, Karakoçan
 Çelebi, Karakoçan
 Çitak, Karakoçan
 Demirdelen, Karakoçan
 Demirtaş, Karakoçan
 Demirtepe, Karakoçan
 Deveci, Karakoçan
 Doğanoğlu, Karakoçan
 Dumluyazı, Karakoçan
 Durmuşköy, Karakoçan
 Gözerek, Karakoçan
 Güllüce, Karakoçan
 Gümüşakar, Karakoçan
 Gündeğdi, Karakoçan
 Hamurkesen, Karakoçan
 Hamzalı, Karakoçan
 İsabey, Karakoçan
 Kalecik, Karakoçan
 Kalkankaya, Karakoçan
 Karaçan, Karakoçan
 Karakoçan, Karakoçan
 Karapınar, Karakoçan
 Karasakal, Karakoçan
 Kavakdere, Karakoçan
 Kavalcık, Karakoçan
 Keklikköy, Karakoçan
 Kırgıl, Karakoçan
 Kızılca, Karakoçan
 Kızılpınar, Karakoçan
 Kocadayı, Karakoçan
 Koçyiğitler, Karakoçan
 Korudibi, Karakoçan
 Köryusuf, Karakoçan
 Kulundere, Karakoçan
 Kuşbayırı, Karakoçan
 Kuşçu, Karakoçan
 Kümbet, Karakoçan
 Mahmutlu, Karakoçan
 Maksutali, Karakoçan
 Mirahmet, Karakoçan
 Okçular, Karakoçan
 Ormancık, Karakoçan
 Özlüce, Karakoçan
 Pamuklu, Karakoçan
 Paşayaylası, Karakoçan
 Pilavtepe, Karakoçan
 Sağın, Karakoçan
 Sağucak, Karakoçan
 Sarıbaşak, Karakoçan
 Sarıcan, Karakoçan
 Sarihan, Karakoçan
 Tekardıç, Karakoçan
 Üçbudak, Karakoçan
 Yalıntaş, Karakoçan
 Yenice, Karakoçan
 Yenikaya, Karakoçan
 Yeniköy, Karakoçan
 Yeşilbelen, Karakoçan
 Yoğunağaç, Karakoçan
 Yukarıovacık, Karakoçan
 Yücekonak, Karakoçan
 Yüzev, Karakoçan

Keban

 Keban
 Akçatepe, Keban
 Akgömlek, Keban
 Altınkürek, Keban
 Altıyaka, Keban
 Aslankaşı, Keban
 Aşağıçakmak, Keban
 Bademli, Keban
 Bahçeli, Keban
 Bayındır, Keban
 Beydeğirmeni, Keban
 Bölükçalı, Keban
 Büklümlü, Keban
 Çalık, Keban
 Çevrekaya, Keban
 Denizli, Keban
 Dürümlü, Keban
 Gökbelen, Keban
 Göldere, Keban
 Güneytepe, Keban
 Kopuzlu, Keban
 Koyunuşağı, Keban
 Kurşunkaya, Keban
 Kuşçu, Keban
 Örenyaka, Keban
 Pınarlar, Keban
 Sağdıçlar, Keban
 Taşkesen, Keban
 Topkıran, Keban
 Ulupınar, Keban
 Üçpınar, Keban

Kovancılar

 Kovancılar
 Akmezra, Kovancılar
 Aşağıdemirci, Kovancılar
 Aşağıkanatlı, Kovancılar
 Aşağıköse, Kovancılar
 Aşağımirahmet, Kovancılar
 Avlağı, Kovancılar
 Bağgülü, Kovancılar
 Bayramyazı, Kovancılar
 Beşpınar, Kovancılar
 Bilalköy, Kovancılar
 Çakırkaş, Kovancılar
 Çatakbaşı, Kovancılar
 Çaybağı, Kovancılar
 Çelebi, Kovancılar
 Çiftlik, Kovancılar
 Değirmentaşı, Kovancılar
 Demirci, Kovancılar
 Durmuşlar, Kovancılar
 Ekinbağı, Kovancılar
 Ekinözü, Kovancılar
 Gedikyurt, Kovancılar
 Göçmezler, Kovancılar
 Gökçedal, Kovancılar
 Gözecik, Kovancılar
 Gülçatı, Kovancılar
 Hacımekke, Kovancılar
 Hacısam, Kovancılar
 İğdeli, Kovancılar
 İsaağamezrası, Kovancılar
 Kacar, Kovancılar
 Kapıaçmaz, Kovancılar
 Karabörk, Kovancılar
 Karaman, Kovancılar
 Karasungur, Kovancılar
 Karıncaköy, Kovancılar
 Kavakköy, Kovancılar
 Kayalık, Kovancılar
 Kolluca, Kovancılar
 Köprüdere, Kovancılar
 Kuşağacı, Kovancılar
 Kuşçu, Kovancılar
 Muratbağı, Kovancılar
 Mustafaköy, Kovancılar
 Nişankaya, Kovancılar
 Okçular, Kovancılar
 Osmanağa, Kovancılar
 Payamlı, Kovancılar
 Salkımlı, Kovancılar
 Saraybahçe, Kovancılar
 Sarıbuğday, Kovancılar
 Soğanlı, Kovancılar
 Soğukpınar, Kovancılar
 Sürekli, Kovancılar
 Şekerci, Kovancılar
 Şenova, Kovancılar
 Tabanözü, Kovancılar
 Taşçanak, Kovancılar
 Taşören, Kovancılar
 Tatar, Kovancılar
 Tepebağ, Kovancılar
 Topağaç, Kovancılar
 Uyandık, Kovancılar
 Uzunova, Kovancılar
 Vali Fahribey, Kovancılar
 Yarımca, Kovancılar
 Yazıbaşı, Kovancılar
 Yenidam, Kovancılar
 Yeniköy Mezrası, Kovancılar
 Yeşildere, Kovancılar
 Yeşilköy, Kovancılar
 Yılbaşı, Kovancılar
 Yoncalıbayır, Kovancılar
 Yukarıdemirli, Kovancılar
 Yukarıkanatlı, Kovancılar
 Yukarıkazanlar, Kovancılar
 Yukarımirahmet, Kovancılar

Maden

 Maden
 Ağadibek, Maden
 Akboğa, Maden
 Altıntarla, Maden
 Arslantaşı, Maden
 Bahçedere, Maden
 Cumhuriyetçi, Maden
 Çakıroğlu, Maden
 Çalkaya, Maden
 Çayırköy, Maden
 Çitliköy, Maden
 Durmuştepe, Maden
 Dutpınar, Maden
 Eğrikavak, Maden
 Gezin, Maden
 Hanevleri, Maden
 Hatunköy, Maden
 Işıktepe, Maden
 Karatop, Maden
 Kartaldere, Maden
 Kaşlıca, Maden
 Kavak, Maden
 Kayalar, Maden
 Kızıltepe, Maden
 Koçkonağı, Maden
 Kumyazı, Maden
 Küçükova, Maden
 Naldöken, Maden
 Örtülü, Maden
 Plajköy, Maden
 Polatköy, Maden
 Sağrılı, Maden
 Tekevler, Maden
 Tepecik, Maden
 Topaluşağı, Maden
 Yenibahçe, Maden
 Yeşilova, Maden
 Yıldızhan, Maden
 Yoncapınar, Maden

Palu

 Palu
 Akbulut, Palu
 Akyürek, Palu
 Altınölçek, Palu
 Andılar, Palu
 Arındık, Palu
 Atik, Palu
 Baltaşı, Palu
 Beydoğan, Palu
 Beyhan, Palu
 Bozçanak, Palu
 Bölükelma, Palu
 Burgudere, Palu
 Büyükçaltı, Palu
 Damlapınar, Palu
 Gemtepe, Palu
 Gökdere, Palu
 Güllüce, Palu
 Gümeçbağlar, Palu
 Gümüşkaynak, Palu
 Hasbey, Palu
 Karacabağ, Palu
 Karasalkım, Palu
 Karataş, Palu
 Kasıl, Palu
 Kayaönü, Palu
 Keklikdere, Palu
 Kırkbulak, Palu
 Köklüce, Palu
 Küçükçaltı, Palu
 Örencik, Palu
 Örgülü, Palu
 Seydili, Palu
 Tarhana, Palu
 Umutkaya, Palu
 Üçdeğirmenler, Palu
 Yarımtepe, Palu
 Yeşilbayır, Palu

Sivrice

 Sivrice
 Akbuğday, Sivrice
 Akseki, Sivrice
 Alaattinköy, Sivrice
 Alıncık, Sivrice
 Aşağıçanakçı, Sivrice
 Başkaynak, Sivrice
 Bekçitepe, Sivrice
 Canuşağı, Sivrice
 Çatakkaya, Sivrice
 Çevrimtaş, Sivrice
 Çortunlu, Sivrice
 Dedeyolu, Sivrice
 Dereboynu, Sivrice
 Dikmen, Sivrice
 Doğanbağı, Sivrice
 Doğansu, Sivrice
 Dörtbölük, Sivrice
 Duygulu, Sivrice
 Düzbahçe, Sivrice
 Elmasuyu, Sivrice
 Gelindere, Sivrice
 Görgülü, Sivrice
 Gözeli, Sivrice
 Günay, Sivrice
 Günbalı, Sivrice
 Hacılar, Sivrice
 Ilıncak, Sivrice
 Kalaba, Sivrice
 Kamışlık, Sivrice
 Kavakköy, Sivrice
 Kavallı, Sivrice
 Kayabağları, Sivrice
 Kayapınar, Sivrice
 Kılıçkaya, Sivrice
 Kösebayır, Sivrice
 Kürkköy, Sivrice
 Mullaali, Sivrice
 Soğukpınar, Sivrice
 Sürek, Sivrice
 Tarlatepe, Sivrice
 Taşlıyayla, Sivrice
 Topaluşağı, Sivrice
 Uslu, Sivrice
 Üçlerce, Sivrice
 Üğrük, Sivrice
 Yaruşağı, Sivrice
 Yedikardeş, Sivrice
 Yedipınar, Sivrice
 Yukarıçanakçı, Sivrice
 Yürekkaya, Sivrice

References 

List
Elazig